Under Cover of Night is a 1937 American action film directed by George B. Seitz, written by Bertram Millhauser, and starring Edmund Lowe, Florence Rice, Nat Pendleton, Henry Daniell, Sara Haden and Dean Jagger. It was released on January 8, 1937, by Metro-Goldwyn-Mayer.

Plot
A professor, Janet Griswald (Sara Haden), is about to announce a great discovery in physics when her jealous husband (Henry Daniell), who collaborated with her, causes her to have a heart attack by throwing her dog out a window. To cover up his heinous deed, he throws a ball the dog was playing with out the window also to make it seem the dog chased after it.

When he can't find her notebook containing the discovery details, he ends up killing several other people. Detective Cross (Edmund Lowe) solves what might have been a perfect crime when he realizes the dog was thrown out the window before the ball.

Cast 
Edmund Lowe as Christopher Cross
Florence Rice as Deb
Nat Pendleton as Sergeant Lucks
Henry Daniell as Marvin Griswald
Sara Haden as Janet Griswald
Dean Jagger as Alan
Frank Reicher as Rudolph Brehmer
Zeffie Tilbury as Mrs. Nash
Henry Kolker as District Attorney Prichard
Marla Shelton as Tonya Van Horne
Theodore von Eltz as John Lamont
Dorothy Peterson as Susan
Harry Davenport as Dr. Reed
Larry Steers as Factually Member (uncredited)

References

External links 
 

1937 films
American action films
1930s action films
Metro-Goldwyn-Mayer films
Films directed by George B. Seitz
American black-and-white films
1930s English-language films
1930s American films
English-language action films